Øivind Bolstad (1 February 1905 – 7 May 1979) was a Norwegian playwright and novelist.

Bolstad was born at Vardø in Finnmark, Norway. 
He made his literary breakthrough with the novel Den røde begonia from 1947. 
Bolstad published a number of short stories and narratives in both Norwegian and foreign magazines as well as a series of books and narrations.

In 1973 he became the recipient of the Dobloug Prize literature award in 1973.

Selected works
 De gylne lenker – (1945)
 Den røde begonia – (1947)
 Profitøren – (1947)
 Gamle Winckels testament – (1949)
 Spøkefuglen på Toska. Historier fra strilelandet – (1955)
 Fortellinger og fabler – (1966)
 Dødens tango – (1967)
 Apassionata – r (1968)
 Jorunn – (1969)
 Bergensikon – (1970)
 Sort messe – (1970)
 Bolstad forteller – (1971)
 Tilgi oss ikke for Helene – (1975)
 Duell med døden – (1977)

References

1905 births
1979 deaths
People from Finnmark
20th-century Norwegian novelists
20th-century Norwegian dramatists and playwrights
Norwegian male dramatists and playwrights
Norwegian male novelists